Irpa Irpa is a small town in Bolivia.

External links 
 Map of the Capinota Province

References

  Instituto Nacional de Estadistica de Bolivia  (INE)

Populated places in Cochabamba Department